Syed Ahmed (born 17 September 1974) is a British businessman. He is the founder and CEO of British technology company Savortex. He was a contestant on the 2006 series of UK Version of The Apprentice where he finished fifth.

Background
Syed was born in Sylhet, Bangladesh. When he was nine months old, he moved with his parents to the United Kingdom and was brought up in East London.

Ahmed is the founder and CEO of Savortex. Ahmed raised in excess of £1.5m to support the global expansion of Savortex. He initially financed the business himself.

Syed has made speeches to the young business enterprise community, and the more general enterprise community in Britain and at the Cleaning Show at the London Excel Exhibition centre.

The Apprentice

Ahmed appeared as a candidate in series two of The Apprentice, a British reality television show hosted by Lord Alan Sugar. The series was broadcast from February to May 2006.

Post Apprentice
Ahmed appeared on Sky News as a paper reviewer – reviewing current and forthcoming newspapers in a celebrity panel. He also has appeared on interviews, at BBC Breakfast with candidate Jo Cameron on the BBC, and also at GMTV. He appeared on Sky One's program called The Match, where 80 celebrities take part to win a place in a celebrity football squad.

A Sky One documentary (from June 2007) called, Syed Ahmed - Hot Air?, featured Ahmed attempting to launch a new company which specialized in hand and body dryers, with £20,000 of his own money, to develop in three months. The program followed the launch of the SA Vortex's hand dryer products.

Charity work
Syed is an ambassador for international charity WaterAid which supports projects all over the world and Bangladesh.

Awards and nominations
In January 2015, he was nominated and won the Entrepreneur of the Year award at the British Muslim Awards.

See also

 British Bangladeshi
 Business of British Bangladeshis
 List of British Bangladeshis

References

External links
 

1974 births
Living people
Bangladeshi Muslims
British Muslims
Bangladeshi emigrants to England
British people of Bangladeshi descent
Naturalised citizens of the United Kingdom
Bangladeshi businesspeople
The Apprentice (British TV series) candidates
Businesspeople from London
People from Sylhet
People educated at Sir John Cass Redcoat School